Mia Bay is an American historian and currently the Roy F. and Jeannette P. Nichols Chair in American History at the University of Pennsylvania. She studies American and African-American intellectual and cultural history and is the author of, among others, The White Image in the Black Mind: African-American Ideas About White People 1830-1925 and To Tell the Truth Freely: The Life of Ida B. Wells.

Life and career 
Bay earned her Ph.D. from Yale University in 1993 and is a professor of American History at the University of Pennsylvania. She has taught at Rutgers University where she also served as co-director of the Black Atlantic Seminar at the Rutgers Center for Historical Analysis and is a member of the Organization of American Historians. She was awarded the Bancroft Prize in 2022 for Traveling Black: A Story of Race and Resistance.

Works 
 The Ambidexter Philosopher: Thomas Jefferson in Free Black Thought, 1776-1877 (forthcoming)
 Traveling Black: A Story of Race and Resistance. Cambridge, Massachusetts : Belknap Press of Harvard University Press, 2021.
 Race and Retail: Consumption across the Color Line. Rutgers Studies on Race and Ethnicity, 2015. (Editor, Contributor).
 Freedom on My Mind: A History of African Americans, with Documents. Co-authored with Deborah Gray White and Waldo Martin, Bedford Books, St. Martin’s, 2012.
 To Tell the Truth Freely: the Life of Ida B. Wells. Hill & Wang, 2009.
 The White Image in the Black Mind: African-American Ideas About White People 1830-1925. New York: Oxford University Press, 2000.

References

External links
 

Year of birth missing (living people)
Living people
Yale University alumni
Rutgers University faculty
University of Pennsylvania faculty
University of Pennsylvania historian
21st-century American historians